This is a list of Sites of Community Importance in Castilla–La Mancha.

See also 
 List of Sites of Community Importance in Spain

References 
 Lisf of sites of community importance in Castile-La Mancha

Castilla–La Mancha